Octavia Salmine Sperati (née Svendsen, February 19, 1847 – March 22, 1918) was a Norwegian actress.

Sperati made her debut in 1865 at the Central Theater in the play Les vieux péchés (Norwegian title: Gamle Minder) by Mélesville and Dumanoir, at the same time as she lived and worked in her Aunt Marthine Lund's photo studio. Later she was associated for a time with the Christiania Norwegian Theater. She went from there to the National Theater in Bergen, when it opened in 1876. This took place in the Comedy House at Engen, where Ole Bull's Norwegian Theater operated from 1850 to 1863. It was later rented out to traveling theater troupes.

Sperati won recognition for her roles in plays by Ludvig Holberg and for her interpretations of Henrik Ibsen's characters, especially her portrayal of Gina Ekdal at the world premiere of The Wild Duck on January 9, 1885. In 1901 and 1902 she played the role of Lona Hessel in The Pillars of Society.

Family
Sperati was married to the conductor Robert Ferdinand Arnold Sperati (1848–1884), who was the son of the conductor and composer Paolo Sperati (1821–1884). Her son Robert Sperati (1872–1945) was an actor and appeared in silent films. Her daughter Alvilde "Lulli" Sperati (1873–1946) was an actress and opera singer with the National Theater in Bergen.

Trivia 
In connection with the first performances of The Wild Duck at the National Theater in Bergen in 1885, Sperati believed that it was her experience from photography work in her Aunt Marthine Lund's studio in Kristiania that enabled her to play the role of Gina Ekdal so naturally:

Sperati's portrait was the only one that survived intact after the fire at the National Theater in Bergen in 1983, an incident that was ascribed a paranormal explanation when Jørgen Fogge, the first to arrive at the scene, claimed to have heard her voice in the middle of the sea of flames.

References

1847 births
1918 deaths
19th-century Norwegian actresses
Norwegian memoirists
People from Kristiansand